Australian rules football in New South Wales dates back to 1866 with organised competition being continuous since the 1880s. Today, in several regions, the sport is moderately popular, including Broken Hill near South Australia, and the Riverina and the South Coast near Victoria. However rugby league in New South Wales remains far more popular elsewhere, particularly in Sydney. The AFL NSW/ACT is the governing body of the sport across the state and the Australian Capital Territory.

Two New South Wales teams currently compete in the sport's leading competition, the professional Australian Football League (AFL): the Sydney Swans and the Greater Western Sydney Giants. The Swans made history in 1982 when they became the first professional Australian sporting team to move interstate. On the back of the code's subsequent growth in popularity in Sydney, the Greater Western Sydney Giants formed in 2009 and made their AFL debut in 2012. They compete against the Swans in the Sydney Derby.

New South Wales holds the record attendance for Australian football outside Victoria, with 72,393 attending a Swans vs Collingwood match at Sydney's Telstra Stadium in 2003. It was also the first state outside of Victoria to host Australian Football International Cup matches, during the 2011 tournament. Over the following decade, participation rates continued to increase across the state, with Australian football surpassing Rugby union in New South Wales in the late 2010s.

Two leading pioneers of the sport, cousins Tom Wills and H. C. A. Harrison, were born in New South Wales, while hundreds of New South Welshmen have competed in the VFL/AFL, among the most notable being Haydn Bunton Sr. and Jock McHale, now 'Legends' in the Australian Football Hall of Fame. Current player Tom Hawkins holds the games record for a New South Walesman with 327, while Bill Mohr holds the goals record with 735, though Hawkins had 732 at the end of the 2022 season just a few goals short of the state record.

History

Sydney

First clubs and matches (1865–1867)
On 26 May 1865 calls were put out to form a Sydney Football Club. The club was incorporated on 17 June 1865 with Richard Driver as its first president and up to 60 members mostly cricketers. It played its first match shortly thereafter on Hyde Park, Sydney, and in August against Sydney University. Two other clubs, the Australian Club and a Sydney University team played football matches against the Sydney club in 1865 though it is not known under what code de Moore (2021) notes that accounts point to strong similarities with the Victorian code but with a strong influence of rugby. Early matches were low scoring and often cancelled mid game and were subject to frequent disputes over the rules. The Sydney University club is often noted as "The Birthplace of Australian Rugby" (in 1863), however historical records show its incorporation in 1865 and that it did not begin playing regularly under rugby rules until 1869.

At its first annual meeting the Sydney Football Club announced that it had formally adopted the Victorian football rules and encouraged Victorian clubs to travel north for intercolonial matches. On 26 May 1866, the rules were published in Bells Life in Sydney. The Australian Club formally adopted the code not long after.

Sydney at this time was a smaller city than Melbourne and Sydney's football scene was likewise, just a handful of clubs, dwarfed by Melbourne's more than a dozen clubs playing in organised competitions. Access to playing fields also proved difficult. Despite a thriving cricket scene, Sydney, like Brisbane, could rarely muster sufficient player numbers for organised football matches. As a result in the late 1860s with few clubs playing and without intercolonial competition forthcoming fledgling clubs soon lost interest and soon disbanded. Newcastle, quite a significant city in its own right at the time, also took an interest in the code and the "Rules of Football" (the Victorian Rules) were published in the press there.

One of the first Sydney schools to adopt the code was Newington College in 1867 before becoming the first Australian school to play rugby in 1869.

With the growing rivalry between the two colonies, Sydney journalists began to murmur their discontent toward the code in 1868, protesting that the "old English game of football" would be preferable to Sydneysiders than a game imported from the rival Colony of Victoria. As part of this wave of discontent in 1869, Newington College switched codes, becoming the first Australian school to play rugby in 1869.

Despite the formation of a handful of football clubs adopting English rules, the Australian game held favour and rugby footballers could manage just 4 matches prior to the 1870s.

Revival and Rugby takeover (1868–1876)
In 1868 a new Sydney Football Club was founded. Once again this club chose the Victorian rules to play over rugby under citing the enormous popularity of the code in Melbourne. Details of matches played under the Victorian rules were scant, however a match was held against the 60th Queen's Own Regiment on 11 July 1868. However the new Sydney club would soon suffer the same fate as its predecessor and organised football disappeared from the Sydney scene.

It wasn't until the 1870s, with a push to introduce rugby into the schools gathering steam and organised competition between clubs that rugby dominated and spread throughout the colony. A key factor for the disappearance of the code in New South Wales, as opposed to Queensland where the code was thriving, was that the newly formed New South Wales Rugby Union in 1874 banned member clubs from playing matches under Victorian rules. As a result the code in the colony was all but forgotten.

Intercolonial competition and NSWFA era (1877–1893)
In 1877 Victoria's Carlton Football Club challenged the Waratah Football Club (now defunct) to reciprocal matches in their respective codes to which the Sydney club accepted. The first match hosted by Waratah was played on the Albert Ground, Sydney under rugby rules in front of 3,000 (then the largest ever football crowd in Sydney) was won by Waratah 2 to Carlton 0, though the Sydneysiders noted that the Victorians were not lacking in the necessary skills, just their knowledge of the game. Reflecting the lesser interest in the Australian rules, the second match was played in front of a smaller crowd of about 1,500 at the Albert Ground with the result being Carlton 6 to Waratah 0. Among the best players were George Coulthard who showed a particular prowess in both codes despite having never played rugby.

Waratah and some others claimed that the Australian rules resulted in a more exciting game, but the rugby interests repeatedly rejected suggestions to switch codes or even play intercolonial matches under alternating rules against Victoria. In response, the proponents of the Australian game formed the New South Wales Football Association (NSWFA) in 1880 and in 1881 the first Australian rules game between NSW and Victoria was played in Sydney. The NSWFA was small, with only a few clubs, including Waratah which switched code in 1882, and competition did not begin in earnest until 1889, when clubs competed for the Flanagan Cup. Despite this, the Sydney Rugby Football Union seeing the new competition as a threat, enforced a strict ban on any of its member clubs from playing Victorian rules.

South Melbourne was the second club to visit New South Wales in 1883 defeating Sydney by just a single goal in front of a large crowd at the Sydney Cricket Ground. Waratah played against South Australia in 1884 at Moore Park. South Melbourne also defeated East Sydney Football Club by a goal in front of 600 spectators.

New South Wales competed against Queensland in 1884 initially losing to its northern neighbour before gaining primacy in their 1886 matches. It also competed against a touring New Zealand Native football team on 29 June 1889 with the result being a 4-4 draw.

The NSWFA had trouble gaining access to enclosed grounds and therefore gate receipts and, with antagonism between its clubs, it collapsed in 1893.

Post-Federation, NSW Football League era: 1903-1917
With the Federation of Australia came new national interest in the Australian code. The NSW Football League, later the NSW Australian Football League (NSWAFL), was formed on 12 February 1903 at a meeting held in the YMCA Hall in George St. The NSWAFL promoted the game in schools and lobbied for VFL exhibition matches in Sydney to promote the code.

The first Victorian Football League match played in Sydney was with Fitzroy Football Club 7.10 defeating the Collingwood Football Club 6.9 at the Sydney Cricket Ground on 24 May 1903. The large attendance of 20,000 saw the exhibition hailed as a success and inspired the league to continue scheduling more matches in Sydney. However, the novelty was short-lived, and follow-up matches quickly began to attract cynicism from the Sydney football public as a VFL push when Geelong Football Club 8.7 (55) defeated Carlton Football Club 6.9 (45) at the SCG a few months later. The matches were seen by the Sydney media as an attempt to force-feed the Victorian game to Sydneysiders who had plenty of rugby to attract their ongoing interest. The poor crowd of 5,000 was much smaller than those of rugby games in the city. Despite the dwindling reception, the NSWAFL was keen to persevere; and, in 1904, Melbourne Football Club 9. 17 (71) defeated Essendon Football Club 6. 3 (39) in front of just 6,000. With the lack of interest, top-level VFL was not to return to Sydney for decades.

In contrast to the reception of the game at professional level, the grassroots level was having enormous success, growing the game in the schools with 48 Sydney schools, including all the Roman Catholic schools playing Australian Football by 1905.

In 1908, thanks largely to the switch of the popular and talented Dally Messenger to the paid football code of rugby league, rugby established itself into the culture of Sydney.

Although Australian football remained popular, the NSWAFL was still denied access to enclosed grounds, and the new professional code of rugby league further lured players from Australian rules. By 1911, however, Australian rules had achieved more support than rugby union, according to The Referee, but only because support had shifted to rugby league.

Interwar popularity surge, interstate success and proposed Rugby League amalgamation: 1918-1939
Popularity peaked in 1921 when attendances at the Sydney competition trebled from hundreds to thousands. While increased gate takings were funding an increase in playing standard and junior development, the local league had exclusive access only to Erskineville Oval and Hampden Oval, relatively small grounds, and had difficulty scheduling matches at grounds also used by the rugby authorities.

Bouyed by a strong professional NSWAFL in Sydney and a thriving schoolboys competition, during the 1920s NSW became a powerhouse that defeated Victorian sides on several occasions at home, notably Melbourne Football Club on 28 July 1923, the VFL at the SCG in 1923 and again at Erskineville Oval by 1 point on 15 August 1925.

The Australian National Football carnival of 1933 was held at the Sydney Cricket Ground. Several matches drew large crowds, particularly those involving New South Wales, Victoria, Queensland, South Australia and West Australia.

Following the successful interstate football carnival, in 1933 a proposal by the New South Wales Rugby League to amalgamate Australian football and rugby league was investigated and a report, with a set of proposed rules, known as Universal football, was prepared by the secretary of the NSWRL, Harold R. Miller and sent to the Australian National Football Council. A trial game was held in secret, but the plans were never instituted.

Three of the original NSWAFL clubs are still in existence and currently play in the Sydney AFL — North Shore, East Sydney (now UNSW-ES) and Balmain, but the league remained almost entirely amateur with limited audience following and sponsorship.

Post-war decline: 1945-1981

World War II proved a massive setback for the code in Sydney. The government insisted that the league cease operations, struggling Sydney clubs were propped up by visiting servicemen from traditional Australian rules states and the popularity of the code among Sydneysiders was at an all time low. Despite this between 1953-57 the game survived in parts of Sydney, Newcastle and Wollongong. Several junior clubs and leagues were established. The "St. George and Sutherland Shire Junior Australian Football Association" was established in southern Sydney and consisted of Penshurst Junior Australian Football Club (JAFC) "Panthers", Miranda JAFC "Bombers", St. Patricks Ramsgate later Ramsgate JAFC "Rams", Heathcote JAFC "Hawks", Cronulla JAFC "Sharks" and, earlier, Peakhurst, Como-Jannali, Boys' Town, Cronulla "Blues" clubs and St. Patricks Sutherland.

Top level VFL returned to the SCG on 14 June 1952 when Collingwood 10.12 (72) defeated Richmond 5.6 (36) in front of 24,174 spectators. However, the league would not return for another few decades.

Sydney Swans era: 1981-
During the late 1970s there was a surge of interest nationally. The VFL scheduled 2 premiership matches for the Sydney Cricket Ground in 1979. On 10 June 1979, Hawthorn 23.18 (156) defeated North Melbourne 16.9 (105) in front of a large crowd of 31,395. However a few months later just 17,140 attended a match in which Richmond 22.20 (152) defeated Fitzroy 20.15 (135). The small attendance didn't deter a financially struggling Fitzroy Lions from conducting a feasibility study into the possibility of moving to North Sydney and a proposal was put forward, but was voted down by its board in 1980. The VFL scheduled 4 matches for the SCG in 1980. These matches were designed to test the market. The VFL's market studies found an increase in television ratings in Sydney and sustained attendance at matches. Based on the market study the VFL stated that there was sufficient support for a Sydney team, and that it intended to have one, possibly as soon as 1982. A 1981 report by Graham Huggins concluded that there was an "untapped market in Sydney which represented an excellent opportunity for the league." In 1981 the VFL had decided that it would establish an entirely new 13th VFL club in Sydney. However this triggered South Melbourne to announce its move to Sydney.

The first professional VFL/AFL players from Sydney and the Sydney AFL did not begin to emerge until the 1980s. Russell Morris was one of the early players to make the grade, followed by Sanford Wheeler, Mark Roberts, Greg Stafford, Nick Davis and Lenny Hayes. In recent years, there has been a dramatic increase in AFL players coming from the Sydney region, and in 2007, a total of 11 AFL players identified themselves as coming from this region.

Riverina 

Australian Football was introduced to the Riverina region of New South Wales in Wagga Wagga in 1881 with a match between sides from the Wagga Wagga Football Club and Albury Football Club. Subsequently, a local competition formed in 1884 around Wagga Wagga. The league went through many incarnations including the:
 Wagga Football Association (1888 – 1889).
 Wagga United Football Association (1890 – 1897).
 Murrumbidgee District Football Association (1897).
 Wagga United Football Association (1898 – 1921).
 Riverina Mainline Football Association (1922).
 Wagga United Football Association (1923, 1924, 1925).
 The Rock and District Association (1926 – 1927) District towns based teams competition.
 Wagga and District Association (1926 – 1927) Wagga based teams competition.
 Wagga Football Association (1928–1957).

The South West Football League (New South Wales) commenced in 1894.

In 1905, the Wagga Football Association representative side lost a close match against the Fitzroy Football Club at Wagga.

In these early days, the Ovens and Murray Football League produced champion players including Haydn Bunton, Sr., who was born and breed in Albury and played with the Albury Rovers FC, Albury Football Club and West Albury prior to playing with Fitzroy in the VFL in 1931.

In 1944, rugby authorities from Sydney began a campaign to oust Australian rules from the Riverina, successfully campaigning for it to be banned from public schools in Albury, Wagga and Junee to be replaced by Rugby League in an effort to expand the code into Victoria.

The Farrer Football League superseded the Albury & District Football League in 1957.

During the 1970s, the region produced many great footballers including the famous Daniher family, Terry Daniher, Neale Daniher, Anthony Daniher and Chris Daniher.

In 1982, at the instigation of the Victorian Country Football League (who had jurisdiction over the area at the time), the South Western District Football League, the Farrer Football League and the Central Riverina Football League were all combined into the Riverina Football League and the Riverina District Football League. The district league reverted to the Farrer Football League in 1985. There were two divisions of the Riverina DFL / Farrer FL between 1983 and 1994.

In 1995, these two leagues came under one umbrella of the Murrumbidgee Valley Australian Football Association.

Further south towards the Murray River, the Ovens & Murray Football League including teams from Albury formed as the Ovens & Murray Football Association in 1893.

Clubs also formed in the smaller towns around the mid to late 1890's and early 1900's and played ad hoc fixtures against each other, as well as organising formal competitions during the first half of the 1900's in Southern Riverina and Central Riverina, such as the:
 Federal District Football Association 1897 – 1902
 Deniliquin Football Association: 1900 – 1932
 McLaurin Football Competition: 1901
 Southern Riverina Football Association: 1905 – 1931
 Greengunyah Football Association: 1906
 Corowa & District Football Association: 1906 & 1907
 Central Riverina Football League: 1907
 Lockhart Football Association: 1908 & 1909, 1911 – 1914, 1921, 1925
 Coreen & District Football Association: 1909 – 1930
 The Rock Football Association: 1910 & 1911, 1914
 Culcairn & District Football Association 1910 – 1913, 1919 – 1921
 Barellan & District Football Association: 1912
 Walbundrie Football Association: 1914
 Milbrulong Football Association: 1914 & 1915
 Walla Walla Football Association: 1915 & 16, 1919 – 1921
 Urangeline Football Association: 1919 – 1926
 Faithful & District Football Association: 1920 – 1939
 Borree Creek Football Association: 1922
 Hume Football Association: 1922 – 1926
 Lockhart Oaklands Line Football Association: 1923 & 1924
 Riverina Football Association: 1924 – 1929
 Osborne & District Football Association: 1927 & 1928
 Lockhart & District Lines Football Association: 1929
 Central Hume Football Association: 1929 – 1934
 Albury & District Football League: 1930 – 1957
 Corowa & District Football Association: 1931 – 1935
 Coreen & District Football League: 1936 – 2007

At the conclusion of the 2007 season the Coreen league was disbanded with most of its clubs joining the Hume league for the 2008 season.

In the modern era, the Riverina has produced a wealth of players for the VFL/AFL, including champion players such as Wayne Carey, Paul Kelly, Dennis Carroll, John Longmire, Leo Barry, Shane Crawford and Brett Kirk. Some other players from the region to have played AFL level football include Isaac Smith (footballer), Luke Breust, Zac Williams, Dean Terlich and Sam Rowe.

Australian rules football is the most popular sport in Albury but is behind rugby league as the largest sport in Wagga Wagga and Griffith.

Western New South Wales

Australian football was first played in Broken Hill in 1885 between Day Dream and Silverton. Informal competition began in 1888 between 4 clubs. The Barrier Ranges Football Association formed in 1890, which later became the Broken Hill Football League. In recent years, the area has produced such players as Dean Solomon, Brent Staker and Taylor Walker. Steve Hywood played on the Half Back Flank for Richmond in the 1972 VFL Grand Final losing to Carlton. Due to transfer problems he resumed his career at Glenelg in 1973 and played in the 1973 Glenelg Premiership team. Hywood was seen as one of the best Back Flankers ever to play the game.

Newcastle 

Australian football was introduced to Newcastle, New South Wales in 1883 when the Wallsend and Plattsburg Football Club was formed by miners from Ballarat.

In 1888, the Black Diamond Cup, Australia's oldest existing and active sporting trophy, was first awarded to the champion team in the region. In 1889 a donation of five guineas by Northern Districts Football Association (Australian Rules) patron Mr. Stewart Keightley and a further donation of five guineas by the proprietors of the Newcastle Morning Herald led to the procurement of the Junior Challenge Cup. This Cup was supplied by A. J. Potter (Alfred John Potter), watchmaker and jeweller of Hunter Street Newcastle.

Five clubs were established in the Newcastle area: Newcastle City, Wallsend and Plattsburg, Northumberland, Lambton, and Singleton.

In 1883, a touring South Melbourne Football Club defeated a combined Northern District team by only one goal.

In 1888, a touring c defeated Wallsend by 10 goals to 5.
The following year, Wallsend defeated Fitzroy.

Isaac Heeney was drafted by the Sydney Swans in 2014 making him the first Newcastle-born footballer to play in the AFL.

South Coast
The game was first played at a senior level in 1969. There are eight teams that compete in the AFLSC senior's competition and eleventeams in the reserves. In terms of junior numbers there has been a significant expansion since 1999. AFL players to have come from the South Coast include Arthur Chilcott, Aidan Riley and Ed Barlow.

North Coast
The game was first played in the Coffs Harbour area as late as 1978. The North Coast Australian Football League was formed in 1982 and grew rapidly with up to 8 clubs by 2000. In recent years the number of clubs has declined due to Woolgoolga, Nambucca, Kempsey and Urunga folding. North Coffs and South Coffs were forced to merge before the start of the 2015 season due to lack of player numbers. The area has produced AFL players including Sam Gilbert.

VFL / AFL competition in NSW

Sydney Swans
The debt ridden South Melbourne Football Club's team was moved to Sydney in 1982 and was renamed the Sydney Swans. It became the first team based outside of Victoria and represented the VFL's first serious attempt to broaden its competition, culminating in its extension into a national competition and renaming to the Australian Football League. One of the unfortunate consequences of the relocation of Swans from South Melbourne to Sydney was the attraction of support, including sponsorship away from the local Australian rules football clubs and leagues and there was an initial decline in the sport locally. The Swans' debt, much of it to the AFL not only hung over attempts to establish the Sydney Swans but now burdened Australian rules football in New South Wales.

On 31 July 1985, Dr Geoffrey Edelsten, through Powerplay Limited, bought the Sydney Swans for $2.9 million in cash with debt payments, funding and other payments spread over five years (rumoured to be a total of $6.3 million). Powerplay was floated and sold shares to supports and the public but with only a licence to the team and debts the uptake was poor. Within less than twelve months, Edelsten resigned as chairman and by 1988 the licence was sold back to the VFL for just $10. Losses were in the millions. The AFL appointed a board to operate the team. Board members Mike Willesee and Craig Kimberley together with Basil Sellers, Peter Weinert as a consortium known as the Private Ownership Group purchased the licence and operated the Sydney Swans until 1993, when the AFL again took over ownership of the team.

With substantial monetary and management support from the AFL, the Sydney Swans continued and with player draft concessions in the early 1990s, has fielded a competitive team throughout the decade. In 1996 the Swans lost the grand final to North Melbourne, which had been their first appearance in a grand final since 1945. The game was played in front of 93,102 at the MCG. Since 1995, the Swans have only missed the finals five times, including in the COVID-affected 2020 season in which they played only four home games and finished third-last on the ladder.

The culmination of the recent success was the 2005 premiership against the West Coast Eagles played in front of 91,898 at the MCG, taking the flag to Sydney for the first time and breaking a 72-year drought for the club from when it was based in South Melbourne. It also broke the longest premiership drought in the history of the competition. Another flag followed not long after, in 2012.

The AFL had eventually established the Swans in Sydney but the model of off-loading a debt-laden team to a new market had resulted in enormous cost to the AFL passed on to its other member clubs and ultimately supporters. Despite the eventual success of the Swans, the former Melbourne based club had struggled for many years to gain support of the Sydney public and the AFL and Australian rules football are still far behind rugby league in the Sydney market.

Establishment of a Second AFL Team: Greater Western Sydney Giants

The Australian Football League expressed intentions to invest in junior development in the growing Sydney market, particularly in Sydney's west and compete head on with the established rugby football codes.

A second team in Sydney became a key strategy of the AFL. In 1999 Sydney became a target for the Proposed relocation of the North Melbourne Football Club, however poor attendance at the club's home matches, low television viewership, and strong opposition from the Sydney Swans saw an end to the initiative.

In 2005, the AFL went on a Sydney-centric recruitment drive, offering a NSW scholarships program and young apprentice scheme. By 2007, at least two of the NSW and ACT scholarship recipients had been officially promoted to AFL rookie lists, qualifying them for selection in the senior squad in the event of long-term injury to listed players.

In 2008, the AFL stated their intention to establish a second team in Sydney to be based in the western suburbs, as part of the expansion of the competition. This process was completed with the establishment of the Greater Western Sydney Giants who played for a season in the North East Australian Football League prior to commencing competition in the Australian Football League in 2012. The Giants struggled in their early years, winning only three games in their first two seasons, but since then made gradual progress up the ladder, culminating in a Grand Final appearance in 2019. Although the Giants have been somewhat successful on the field, despite more than $200 million in AFL investment, the club has made little impact in growing attendance, television viewership or participation in the region.

AFL NSW/ACT Commission Limited
The AFL established the AFL NSW/ACT Commission Limited to govern its expansion in New South Wales and the Australian Capital Territory.

AFL Women's
GWS was awarded a license for the inaugural AFL Women's season with the Sydney Swans deciding not to bid for entry until later.

 was awarded a license in 2021 and made its debut in round 1 AFL Women's Season 7 match against  at the North Sydney Oval also setting a new record crowd for a stand alone women's Australian rules football in New South Wales on 27 August 2022 with 8,264 in attendance.

Participation
Ausplay reported that there were 69,168 regular participants in Australian rules in New South Wales in 2019.7,225 (adult) While lower than the AFL reported figure for 2011 of 131,829 (which included the ACT and 41,626 Auskick registrations) the state has now eclipsed rugby union participation in New South Wales.

In 2012, the figure was 148,230 people of which 48,965 were Auskick registrations. In 2013, the number of Australian football participants in NSW and the ACT had jumped up to 177,949 of which 47,888 were Auskick participants. According to the AFL Football Record this means that the only state that has more Australian football players is Victoria.

The Australian Bureau of Statistics "Children's Participation in Cultural and Leisure Activities, Australia, Apr 2009" estimated 18,000 Australian rules football participants in NSW and 1,400 in the ACT.(table 22) The ABS utilised a small sample size of 20,126 private dwelling in obtaining their data of participation numbers for 2011/12.

In 2007, there were 7,225 senior players in NSW and the ACT and in 2006 a total of around 95,100 participants. Although Australian rules football was one of the fastest growing sports in the state, the overall participation per capita was only about 1%, the lowest in Australia.

All participation figures have been distorted however by clinics being counted.

Audiences

Attendance Record
 72,393 (2003). AFL Sydney Swans v. Collingwood Football Club at Stadium Australia, Sydney.

Attendances
In 2006, the Sydney Swans averaged 41,205 people through the gate per home match. In 2013, the average had decreased to 29,104 with the suggestion that this was partly due to the redevelopment of the Bradman Stand at the SCG.

Major Australian rules football events in New South Wales
 Sydney Derby, also called The Battle of the Bridge – Swans v Giants (held twice annually at ANZ Stadium starting in 2012)

Players

Greats

A number of notable players have been born in New South Wales or played the majority of their junior careers in New South Wales; many of these players have been from the traditional Australian rules football areas of Broken Hill or the Riverina. Australian football pioneers Tom Wills and H. C. A. Harrison were born in New South Wales in the 1830s.

Notable players from the Riverina include: Australian Football Hall of Fame Legend Haydn Bunton, Sr. (Albury), who was the first player born in New South Wales to win the Brownlow Medal and the Sandover Medal, in 1931 and 1938 respectively; Paul Kelly from Wagga the first New South Welshman to win the Brownlow, Shane Crawford (Finley) who won the Brownlow in 1999; and Wayne Carey (Wagga), won the Leigh Matthews Trophy twice in the 1990s. Notable players from Broken Hill include Dave Low, Robert Barnes and Bruce McGregor, who all won Magarey Medals in the 1910s and 1920s, and Jack Owens, a three-time South Australian National Football League (SANFL) leading goalkicker.

Many notable players have also been recruited from Sydney, as the game has had a long history, having been played in the city since 1880. This pre-dates many other major sports. Despite the lack of media attention the game has received, Sydney has still generated many players of high quality. Some of the best include Roger Duffy (1954 premiership player who was recruited from Newtown), Michael Byrne (1983 premiership player with Hawthorn who was recruited from the Sydney club of North Shore), Bob Merrick (a leading goal kicker in the 1920s recruited from East Sydney), Mark Roberts a 202-game AFL player from 1985 to 1999 who played junior football for Ramsgate AFC and senior football for St. George AFC before playing in the AFL for the Sydney Swans, Brisbane Bears and North Melbourne, notably in their 1996 premiership, Greg Stafford (a 200-game player recruited from Western Suburbs in Sydney), Jarrad McVeigh (2012 AFL premiership captain) and his brother Mark (who played for ), Lewis Roberts-Thomson (2005 & 2012 premiership player for the Swans) and Lenny Hayes (2010 Norm Smith Medallist) amongst others.

Men's

Current players

AFL players from NSW

Women's

Current players

ALFW players from NSW

Representative Team

The New South Wales representative team, nicknamed the Blues, played Interstate matches against other Australian states and Territories.
The team wore a blue uniform with a Waratah symbol badge and until the 1970s was the only representative team to buck the trend of sleeveless guernseys (in effort to fit with the fashions in rugby). The Blues defeated the powerhouse Victoria team in 1923 and also in 1990 under State of Origin rules at the Sydney Cricket Ground. Its final appearance was at the 1988 Adelaide Bicentennial Carnival.

In 1993 the game's new governing body, the AFL Commission created a composite team with the Australian Capital Territory, the NSW/ACT Rams. Notable New South Welshmen in this team included Wayne Carey and Brownlow Medalist Shane Crawford. Senior players have not represented the state since.

NSW was an inaugural participant in the National underage titles. It competed from 1993-2016 as NSW/ACT after which it was dropped from the national championships and instead now competes in the TAC Cup.

See Also Interstate matches in Australian rules football

Principal venues
The following venues are the largest that meet AFL Standard criteria and have been used to host AFL (National Standard) or AFLW level matches (Regional Standard) and have hosted such matches in the last decade.

Sydney
 Sydney Cricket Ground
 Stadium Australia, Sydney Olympic Park.
 Sydney Showground Stadium, Sydney Olympic Park.
 North Sydney Oval
 Blacktown ISP Oval, Rooty Hill.
 Bruce Purser Reserve, Kellyville.
 Ern Holmes Oval, Pennant Hills.
 Henson Park, Marrickville.
 Picken Oval, Croydon Park
 Trumper Park Oval, Paddington.
 Monarch Oval, Macquarie Fields.
 Village Green, University of New South Wales, Kensington.
 Drummoyne Oval
 Gore Hill Oval
 Olds Park, Penshurst.
 University Oval, University of Sydney.
 Jubilee Oval, Carlton

Regional NSW
 Lavington Sports Ground, Hamilton Valley, Albury.
 Newcastle Number 1 Sports Ground, Newcastle
 Coffs Harbour International Stadium, Coffs Harbour
 Narrandera Sports Ground, Narrandera
 North Dalton Park, Towradgi, Wollongong.
 Robertson Oval, Wagga Wagga

Books

References

External links
 The Hidden Story of Australian Rules in Sydney
 NSW Footy History
 Australian Rules Almost Held Sydney
 
 Sydney Australian Football Foundation – non-profit organisation assisting development of the code in Sydney

 
New
History of Australian rules football